Dalton Andrea Hilliard (born January 21, 1964) is an American former professional football player who was a running back in the National Football League (NFL) for the New Orleans Saints from 1986-1993. He played his entire NFL career for the Saints and was a Pro Bowl selection in 1989. He is a member of the New Orleans Saints Hall of Fame.

College career
Hilliard played college football at Louisiana State University from 1982 to 1985. He is one of three running backs to rush for over 4,000 yards in their career at LSU. He is 5th all-time in rushing touchdowns in SEC history with 44.

*Does not include bowl games.

Professional career
Hilliard played eight seasons with the New Orleans Saints. His most productive season came in 1989 when he rushed for 1,262 yards and scored 18 touchdowns.  He became the first player in NFL history to rush for 1200 yards, catch 50 passes, score 18 touchdowns and have fewer than 8 fumbles in a single season.

NFL career statistics

Personal life
Hilliard is from Patterson, Louisiana and lived in Destrehan, Louisiana during his playing career. He is the father of Dalton Hilliard, Jr., who played football at Brother Martin High School and  Nicholls State.
 
Hilliard is the uncle of Ike Hilliard and  Kenny Hilliard.

References

1964 births
Living people
American football running backs
LSU Tigers football players
National Conference Pro Bowl players
New Orleans Saints players
People from Destrehan, Louisiana
People from Iberia Parish, Louisiana
People from Patterson, Louisiana
Players of American football from Baton Rouge, Louisiana